Tengatangi (Taturoa) is a village on Atiu in the Cook Islands. It forms part of the Tengatangi–Areora–Ngatiarua electoral division.

References 

Populated places in the Cook Islands
Atiu